MonotaRO Co., Ltd., is a Japanese e-commerce company of industrial supply products based in Hyogo, Japan. The company was named to Forbes Asia "Best Under A Billion" list in 2013.

Overview 
MonotaRO sells Maintenance, repair, and operations products through internet and catalogs, targeting small and mid-sized manufacturing companies. MonotaRO sells various product categories such as personal protective equipment, hand tools, fasteners, and lab supplies.  It has more than 1 million customers in Japan.

The company name MonotaRO is an acronym for Maintenance, Repair & Operations.  It also means to have sufficient number of products in Japanese.  It is also a play on the name of the Japanese hero Momotaro.

Global expansion 
In 2013, MonotaRO began web-based sales in Singapore. In 2014 web-based sales expanded to Malaysia, Thailand, and Australia. Now they ship to following countries. (countries names are arranged alphabetically)

History 
 2000 - Sumitomo and W. W. Grainger, Inc. founded a company as joint venture in Japan
 2001 - Website launch, which began and nationwide sales  
 2004 - Start selling private label (MonotaRO, Otokomae-MonotaRO, and Osaka-Spirit) 
 2006 - Launch IHC MonotaRO, targeting private use customers 
 2006 - Listed on the Tokyo Stock Exchange
 2009 - W. W. Grainger, Inc. acquired a majority ownership of the company 
 2013 - Started service in Singapore
 2014 - Started service in Malaysia, Thailand, and Australia

References

External links 
 MonotaRO 
 IHC.MonotaRO
 MonotaRO Indonesia
 MonotaRO Singapore
 MonotaRO Malaysia

Companies listed on the Tokyo Stock Exchange
Industrial supply companies
Retail companies established in 2000
Internet properties established in 2000
Online retailers of Japan
W. W. Grainger